Edgar Lindenau Aabye (14 September 1865 – 30 April 1941) was a Danish athlete and journalist who earned a gold medal in the tug of war at the age of 34	 in the 1900 Summer Olympics in Paris, France, after joining the team as a last-minute substitute.

Aabye was an accomplished athlete who had previously won a Danish championship in swimming (1896) and been a competitor in rowing and cycling. Aabye joined the team which then competed in the only tug-of-war contest, defeating the French team for the gold medal. Initially, Aabye was not a member of the tug-of-war team but was working at the Paris Olympics as a journalist for the Politiken newspaper.  When a member of the combined Dano-Swedish tug of war team was injured, the team asked Aabye to fill in as a last-minute substitute.

He was the nation's first sports journalist as he worked for the broadsheet Politiken from 1892 until 1935. He had previously studied theology and taught history and geography at a middle school.

References

External links
 
 Edgar Aabye at Olympics Database

1865 births
1941 deaths
Tug of war competitors at the 1900 Summer Olympics
Olympic tug of war competitors of Denmark
Olympic gold medalists for Denmark
Olympic medalists in tug of war
19th-century Danish journalists
People from Helsingør
Medalists at the 1900 Summer Olympics
20th-century Danish journalists